Sidney (sometimes Sydney) Edward Dickinson (November 28, 1890 – April, 1980) was an American painter.

Dickinson was born in Wallingford, Connecticut, and was the son of a Congregationalist minister, Charles H. Dickinson. His parents moved frequently; from 1894 to 1901 the family lived in Canandaigua, New York, and they spent time in Fargo, North Dakota and Calhoun, Alabama, where they assisted his aunt, Charlotte Thorn, in the running of the Calhoun Colored School. Dickinson studied with George Bridgman and William Merritt Chase at the Art Students League of New York from 1910 to 1911, and from 1910 to 1912 he was a pupil of Douglas Volk at the school of the National Academy of Design. He spent time traveling around the country doing manual labor, working in lumber camps and finding employment as a surveyor's roadman and farmhand.

Dickinson first exhibited with the National Academy in 1915, hanging a self-portrait at that year's winter show. He received a Julius Hallgarten Prize on the occasion of his third show with the organization, in 1917, and continued to exhibit there for nearly fifty years. He earned another Hallgarten Prize in 1924; the Isaac N. Maynard Prize in 1933 and 1938; the Benjamin Altman Prize in 1936; and the Andrew Carnegie Prize in 1942. He served on the Academy Council from 1930 until 1933. He was elected a member of the American Academy of Arts and Letters in 1931.

Dickinson was active as an instructor for many years, teaching at the Art Students League in 1919–1920 and heading a life class at the National Academy from 1928 to 1931 and again from 1939 to 1943. In the summers of 1943 and 1944 he returned to the League to teach, and became a regular faculty member there in 1949, retiring in 1973. Pupils included Albert Wasserman, James Rosenquist, Richard Pionk, and Robert Neffson. Dickinson kept a studio in Carnegie Hall until retiring to Windsor, Vermont, where he would die, in the later 1970s.

Dickinson was a prolific portraitist; among the artists whose portraits he showed at the Academy are Paul Arndt, Robert Aitken, Louis Bosa, Eugene Higgins, Hobart Nichols, Raphael Soyer, and his second cousin Edwin Dickinson. A self-portrait is part of the Academy's permanent collection, as are portraits of Mary Gray, George Wharton Edwards, Harry Wilson Watrous, Georg J. Lober, Frederick K. Detwiller, Donald De Lue, Ernest Nathaniel Townsend, John Carroll, Theodore E. Blake, Otto R. Eggers, Robert S. Hutchins, Bryant Baker, and Edgar I. Williams. Other portraits include a notable set depicting members of the Rockefeller family, the official mayoral portrait of Fiorello LaGuardia, and a portrait of Governor Thomas E. Kilby of Alabama. Another portrait of Baker, donated by the subject, is owned by the National Portrait Gallery, while a portrait of photographer Paul Juley is part of the collection of the Smithsonian American Art Museum. Other portraits are owned by the Figge Art Museum, Harvard University, Princeton University, the United States Department of State, and the University of Iowa. Dickinson also painted many figurative works throughout his career; a number of these were born of his experiences in Alabama, and are owned by the Greenville County Museum of Art in South Carolina. He was noted for working in wet-on-wet style, and composed many of his works directly in the studio, often completing a portrait during a single three- or four-hour sitting.

His children were wildlife biologist Nate Dickinson and mechanical engineer Thorn Watson Dickinson. Dickinson's grandson Charles Dickinson is also a painter.

References

1890 births
1980 deaths
20th-century American painters
American male painters
American portrait painters
People from Wallingford, Connecticut
Painters from Connecticut
Art Students League of New York alumni
National Academy of Design alumni
Art Students League of New York faculty
National Academy of Design faculty
National Academy of Design members
Members of the American Academy of Arts and Letters
Students of William Merritt Chase
20th-century American male artists